Geoffrey M. Sanderson (born February 1, 1972) is a Canadian former professional ice hockey left winger, most notably for the Hartford Whalers and Columbus Blue Jackets of the National Hockey League (NHL).

Playing career
Drafted by the Hartford Whalers 36th overall in the 1990 NHL Entry Draft, Sanderson made his NHL debut at the tail end of the 1990–91 season with the Whalers. He was on the roster for their first round playoff loss, and was then sent to bolster their American Hockey League affiliate, the Springfield Indians, who went on to win the Calder Cup. Sanderson played in 64 games in his first full season for the club in 1991–92. In the first round of that year's playoffs, Hartford was trailing the Montreal Canadiens 2–1 late in the second period of Game 7, when Sanderson scored his first career playoff goal to tie the game. The Canadiens eventually won in double overtime. Over his next five years in Hartford, Sanderson scored more than 30 goals every season with the exception of the 1994–95 lockout season, but the Whalers missed the playoffs each year.

Sanderson remained with the franchise as they moved from Hartford and become the Carolina Hurricanes, but halfway through the 1997-98 NHL season he was traded to the Vancouver Canucks, and shortly thereafter to the Buffalo Sabres in a separate trade. In Buffalo he did not receive the same level of ice time he had in Hartford, but he experienced the most playoff time of his career. In the first round the Sabres defeated the Philadelphia Flyers 4–1, to set up a quarterfinal matchup with the Canadiens. In game 1 Sanderson scored twice, including the game-winning overtime goal, in front of the home crowd to give the Sabres a 1–0 series lead. Buffalo also won game 2, and Sanderson scored a pivotal goal in game 3, which was won by the Sabres in double overtime. The Sabres completed the sweep, but then lost to the Washington Capitals 4 games to 2 in the Eastern Conference Finals.

During the 1998-99 NHL season the Sabres continued their winning ways and Sanderson continued to put up respectable third line numbers. After the Sabres swept the Ottawa Senators in the first round of the playoffs, and then dispatched the Boston Bruins in six games, they once again advanced to the Eastern Conference Finals, this time against their cross-lake rivals, the Toronto Maple Leafs. In game 1 Sanderson scored his first goal of the playoffs, which turned out to be the game winner as the Sabres won 5–4. The Leafs won game 2, and the Sabres won game 3. In game 4 Buffalo started off strong building a 3–0 lead following second period goals by Brian Holzinger and Rob Ray. Just twenty-two seconds after Ray's goal, Sanderson made it 4–0, and then made it 5–0 with another goal ten minutes later. The Sabres went on to win the series, and advanced to the Stanley Cup Final for the second time in team history. Facing the Dallas Stars, Buffalo took game 1 on the road in overtime, but Dallas fought back and won the next two games. In game 4 in Buffalo, Sanderson beat Ed Belfour to score the game's first goal halfway through the first period, and Buffalo eventually won the game, sending the series back to Dallas tied 2–2. Dallas won game 5, and then won game 6 of the 1999 Stanley Cup Finals – and the Stanley Cup as a result – on a controversial Brett Hull triple overtime goal.

Sanderson was selected by the Columbus Blue Jackets in the 2000 NHL Expansion Draft, and scored 30-plus goals in 2000–01 and 2002–03. He was the first Blue Jacket to score a hat trick. He returned to Vancouver at the trade deadline in 2003–04. With the Canucks Sanderson played his final postseason games in 2004, scoring a goal in Canucks' first round loss to the Calgary Flames. 

He was reclaimed by Columbus off waivers in the off-season, and Sanderson was traded two games into the 2005–06 season to the Phoenix Coyotes. After scoring 25 goals in 75 games with Phoenix, Sanderson signed a two-year contract with the Philadelphia Flyers in the off-season.

A disappointing year with Philadelphia resulted in Sanderson being traded to Edmonton with Joni Pitkanen in exchange for Joffrey Lupul and former Oilers captain Jason Smith. Sanderson scored two goals against Philadelphia the first time he played against his former team. Following the 2008 season, Edmonton declined to tender Sanderson a contract, ending his professional playing career.

Sanderson ended his NHL career with a total of exactly 700 points, making him the most successful hockey player to come out of the Northwest Territories.

Retirement
Sanderson accepted a developmental coaching and scouting role within the New York Islanders organization to begin the 2010–11 season. After his second season with the Islanders, Sanderson opted to step away from his position citing family reasons, and a similar lifestyle to his playing days. Sanderson formed and currently runs an oil and gas rental equipment company, Breakaway Matting, alongside former teammate Brendan Morrison.

Personal life
Sanderson is one of few NHL players to have been born in the  Northwest Territories (Hay River) and spent his early years in Pine Point, NWT, while his father worked as a pharmacist in the now defunct town. Geoff then spent his junior high school years in High Level, Alberta. His dad, Aaron, owned the only pharmacy in High Level and would close the store every Saturday at 5:55 pm so he could be at home by 6 pm to watch Hockey Night in Canada with his boys. As a teenager, Geoff relocated with his family to St. Albert,  Alberta, for Grades 10-12. Sanderson currently resides in Calgary, Alberta, with his wife Ellen and three sons. His son Jake Sanderson is a defenceman for the Ottawa Senators.

In 2013, Sanderson coached his oldest son's peewee team, the Springbank Whalers of Calgary.

He has two cousins who have also played in the NHL: Wade Brookbank, who most recently played for the Rockford IceHogs, and Sheldon Brookbank, who was a former assistant coach for the Chicago Blackhawks.

Career statistics

Regular season and playoffs

International

Awards and honours

See also
List of NHL players with 1000 games played

References

External links
 

1972 births
Buffalo Sabres players
Canadian ice hockey left wingers
Carolina Hurricanes players
Columbus Blue Jackets players
Edmonton Oilers players
Genève-Servette HC players
Hartford Whalers draft picks
Hartford Whalers players
HPK players
Ice hockey people from the Northwest Territories
Living people
National Hockey League All-Stars
New York Islanders coaches
New York Islanders scouts
People from Hay River
Philadelphia Flyers players
Phoenix Coyotes players
Springfield Indians players
Swift Current Broncos players
Vancouver Canucks players
Canadian expatriate ice hockey players in Finland
Canadian expatriate ice hockey players in Switzerland
Canadian ice hockey coaches